Robert Higgins was an American black professional baseball player who played for the Syracuse Stars in 1887 and 1888. He signed with the club at age 20 in 1887. In 1887, he went 20–7 with a 2.90 ERA. He also hit .294 and stole 28 bases over the course of 41 games. In 1888, he went 17–7 with a 2.56 ERA and batted .225. The Stars went on to win the International League title that year. The following offseason, Higgins moved to Memphis, Tennessee and ran his own barber shop for years. He made a comeback in 1896 with the Cuban Giants, which was his only season in the Negro Leagues.

References

American baseball players

1867 births
Year of death missing